Janet Staiger (born 1946) is the William P. Hobby Centennial Professor Emeritus of Communication in the Department of Radio-Television-Film and Professor Emeritus of Women's and Gender Studies at the University of Texas at Austin.

Education
She received her B.A. at the University of Nebraska at Omaha in 1968, her M.A. at Purdue University in 1969, and her Ph.D. from the University of Wisconsin, Madison in 1981.

Career
As a theoretician and historian of American film and television, Staiger has published on the Hollywood mode of production, the economic history and dynamics of the industry and its technology, post-structural and postfeminist/queer approaches to authorial studies, the historical reception of cinema and television programs, and cultural issues involving gender, sexuality, and race/ethnicity.

Staiger broke ground in film studies with her early articles and then co-authorship of The Classical Hollywood Cinema: Film Style and Mode of Production to 1960 (1985, with David Bordwell and Kristin Thompson).  Applying Marxist materialist historiography and economic theory to the Hollywood film industry, she organized well-known and also unexplored facts into a coherent explanation of why this worldwide dominant industry operates as it does.  Both cultural factors (signifying practices such as how to tell a "good" story and character development that focuses on individual choice-making) and economic factors (i.e., efficiency, divided labor, trended technological innovations) explain the series of Hollywood modes of production from the camera-person mode, through the director-, director-unit, central-producer, producer-unit, and, finally, the package-unit systems, the last of which remains the major method for contemporary Hollywood financing and labor organization.

One of the major points that Staiger made was avoiding economic-only explanations to the causes for this industry's structure and processes.  People do not try to produce the cheapest film; they need to make films that encourage audiences to return repeatedly to the theaters.  She popularized the opposition between "standardization versus product differentiation" to explain the balances between genres and innovations.  She also emphasized the impact of public and social discourse about what counts as "good" filmmaking according to film workers and reviewers of films.  One important feature of her research is the extensive quotation of period conversation from reviewers and from industry professionals about the film practices. She has considered several of the major institutions in Hollywood:  the screenwriting profession, the cinematographer associations, the unions, and the Society for Motion Picture and Television Engineers.

Over the several decades since this landmark work, Staiger also attempted to counter determinist historical thinking that places too much emphasis on over-powering systemic conditions. The point that Raymond Williams made in his work was important to her thinking:  every historical moment has both its residual and progressive moments. Thus, she turned to thinking about authorship:  theorizing individual agency within this creative industry.  The structuralist and materialist critiques of agency do not negate the possibilities of bounded action by individuals; after all, "people also make history."  Since the early 2000s, Staiger has contributed several essays to outline a nuanced approach to agency within complex socio-cultural conditions.  Drawing from Michel Foucault's late work, she has posited that individuals have economic, sociological, and psychological imperatives to "self-fashion" their creative work. These imperatives work well within the Hollywood system because the system tends to reward innovation within its norms of practice and recognizes self-projection behaviors.  Branding and star/celebrity activities fit well within this theory as do directorial or writing flourishes to suggest some sort of auteurism.

Staiger also argued for a more complex analysis of the production of representations as a consequence of Hollywood's production mode.  In her Bad Women: Regulating Sexuality in Early American Cinema, 1907-1915 (1995), Staiger points out that simply conceptualizing Hollywood films as promoting repressive ideologies is completely inadequate to the dynamics of how entertainment industries work.  Rather, the industry has incentives to sensationalize, for example, women's sexuality.  While such representations may eventually be moralized into appropriate conduct by the end of a film, it is obvious that messages about choice and behavior are also stretched.  For instance, women in this period were permitted to be sexual beings; what differentiated them were often the objects of their choice and their behavior in securing their personal interests.

Meanwhile, Staiger was also one of the earliest film and media scholars to explore reception studies. In The Classical Hollywood Cinema, she and her co-authors pointed out that they were not covering exhibition and reception of these films by their everyday audiences.  However, that problem intrigued Staiger.  Her solution was to ground herself in the new field of reception studies (the work of Jauss, Iser, Fish, and British Cultural Studies). By 1984, she began a series of scholarly presentations and published papers culminating in her 1992 book, Interpreting Films: Studies in the Historical Reception of American Cinema. She has subsequently published three more books and one co-edited anthology in this area:  Perverse Spectators: The Practices of Film Reception (2000), Blockbuster TV: Must-See Sitcoms in the Network Era (2000), Media Reception Studies (2005), and Political Emotions (2010, co-edited with Ann Cvetkovich and Ann Reynolds).

In these books and articles, Staiger has examined how we understand interpretations produced by everyday audiences.  Trying to stress contextual factors and social identities (sex, gender, race, sexuality, age), she focused on normal and unusual audience responses (i.e., underground movies being used for community-building, images being collected and preserved for remembering movies, men crying at James Bond films).  Her work did not merely think about what meanings people make in watching film and TV but also what emotions occur and how those matter to audiences and to society.

Staiger has served on various national committees including the National Film Preservation Board of the U.S. Library of Congress (1992–96) and the jury for the American Film Institute's Television Awards (2010, 2012).  She is past president of the Society for Cinema and Media Studies (1991–93) and has served on the Executive Committees of the Cultural Studies Association (U.S.) (2005–09) and the Reception Studies Society (2005–present).   She curated an exhibition on the television show Dallas for the Bob Bullock Texas State History Museum in Austin in 2008.

Bibliography
Political Emotions co-ed. with Ann Cvetkovich and Ann Reynolds (Routledge, 2010)
Convergence Media History co-ed. with Sabine Hake (Routledge, 2008)
Media Reception Studies (New York University, 2005)
Authorship and Film co-ed. with David Gerstner (Routledge, 2003)
Perverse Spectators: The Practices of Film Reception (New York University Press, 2000)
Blockbuster TV: Must-See Sitcoms in the Network Era (New York University Press, 2000)
Bad Women: Regulating Sexuality in Early American Cinema (University of Minnesota Press, 1995)
The Studio System (ed.) (Rutgers University Press, 1995)
Interpreting Films: Studies in the Historical Reception of American Cinema (Princeton University Press, 1992)
The Classical Hollywood Cinema: Film Style and Mode of Production to 1960, co-author with David Bordwell and Kristin Thompson (Routledge & Kegan Paul/Columbia University Press, 1985)

References

University of Texas at Austin faculty
University of Wisconsin–Madison alumni
People from Austin, Texas
Living people
1946 births
Presidents of the Society for Cinema and Media Studies